Kenneth Robinson Jr. (born January 8, 1999) is an American football safety for the Pittsburgh Steelers of the National Football League (NFL). He played college football at West Virginia, and previously played for the St. Louis BattleHawks of the XFL and Carolina Panthers of the NFL.

High school career 
Robinson grew up in Wilkinsburg, Pennsylvania and began his high school career as a freshman at Central Catholic before transferring to University Prep. His junior season was derailed by a leg injury. After the season, Robinson transferred to Imani Christian Academy for his senior year. He was named PIAA all-state 1A first-team as a defensive back. A 3-star recruit, Robinson committed to West Virginia over offers from Virginia Tech, Iowa State, Toledo, Temple, Cincinnati and Pittsburgh.

College career 
Robinson mainly played safety for the West Virginia Mountaineers after playing cornerback for several games as a freshman. He returned an interception 94 yards for a touchdown against Texas as a freshman and made the game-saving pick versus Kansas State. Robinson had 123 tackles and 7 interceptions, two of which were returned for a defensive touchdown, in his two-year college career. He was named to the First-team All-Big 12 after his sophomore season. Robinson was expelled from West Virginia after a student code of conduct violation involving academic fraud. He initially entered the transfer portal in June 2019, but ultimately decided to join the XFL to provide for his family's immediate needs. Robinson's ambitious professional move was praised as "trailblazing" by USA Today.

Professional career

St. Louis BattleHawks 
In October 2019, Robinson was drafted by the St. Louis BattleHawks via the 2020 XFL Draft. He was picked up in the 5th round (39th overall) of Phase 4: Defensive Backs. Robinson was the only player in the XFL who was eligible for the 2020 NFL Draft, and the XFL paid for him to take college classes online. He said he chose the XFL to help his mother, who had been diagnosed with cancer. In Week 3 of the season, Robinson had an interception, and in Week 5 he was nominated for the XFL's Star of the Week with a pick and a sack. In the coronavirus-shortened XFL season, Robinson started all five games for the BattleHawks and had 21 tackles and two interceptions. He had his contract terminated when the league suspended operations on April 10, 2020.

Carolina Panthers
The Carolina Panthers selected Robinson with the 152nd pick in the fifth round of the 2020 NFL Draft, making him the first XFL player to be drafted into the NFL. Robinson was represented at the draft by Beyond Athlete Management. He was waived on September 6, 2020, and re-signed to the practice squad the next day. Robinson was promoted to the active roster on October 20, 2020.

On August 31, 2021, Robinson was waived by the Panthers, and re-signed to the practice squad the next day.
 He was promoted to the active roster on October 14, 2021.

In Week 6 against the Minnesota Vikings, Robinson scored his first NFL touchdown on a special teams play in which he recovered a punt blocked by Frankie Luvu for 4 yards to the end zone during the 34–28 overtime loss.

On August 30, 2022, Robinson was waived by the Panthers and signed to the practice squad the next day. He was released on September 2. He was re-signed on October 5.

Pittsburgh Steelers
On January 11 2023, Robinson signed a reserve/futures contract with the Pittsburgh Steelers.

References

External links 
 Twitter
 ESPN profile
Kenny Robinson Timeline Events

1999 births
Living people
Players of American football from Pittsburgh
People from Wilkinsburg, Pennsylvania
American football safeties
West Virginia Mountaineers football players
St. Louis BattleHawks players
Carolina Panthers players
Pittsburgh Steelers players